Gun Shy is an American sitcom that was shown on CBS from March 15 to April 19, 1983. The series, produced by Walt Disney Productions, was based on its popular comedy-western films The Apple Dumpling Gang (1975) and The Apple Dumpling Gang Rides Again (1979).

Premise
Set in 1869, a gambler (Van Dyke) wins two children (Mitchell and Andersen) in a poker game and moves to Quake City, California.

Cast
 Barry Van Dyke as Russell Donovan
 Tim Thomerson as Theodore Ogilvie
 Geoffrey Lewis as Amos Tucker
 Keith Mitchell as Clovis (episodes 1–4)
 Adam Rich as Clovis (episodes 5–6)
 Bridgette Andersen as Celia
 Henry Jones as Homer McCoy
 Janis Paige as Nettie McCoy
 Pat McCormick as Col. Mound

US TV Ratings

Episodes

References

External links
 
 Gun Shy at TV Guide

1983 American television series debuts
1983 American television series endings
1980s American sitcoms
Television series set in the 1860s
1980s Western (genre) television series
English-language television shows
CBS original programming
Television shows set in California
Television series by Disney
Television series based on Disney films
Television shows set in Tennessee